A crescent is an architectural structure where a number of houses, normally terraced houses, are laid out in an arc to form a crescent shape. A famous historic crescent is the Royal Crescent in Bath, England.

Examples
The following are examples of architectural crescents:
 Adelaide Crescent, Hove, England
 Bofills båge, Stockholm, Sweden, by architect Ricardo Bofill
 Buxton Crescent, Buxton, Derbyshire, England
 The Crescent, Limerick, Ireland, double Georgian style crescent
 The Crescent, Scarborough, North Yorkshire, England
 Lansdown Crescent, Bath, England
 Marino Crescent, Dublin, Ireland developed by Charles Ffolliott
 Park Circus, Glasgow, Scotland
 Park Crescent, Brighton, England
 Park Town, Oxford, England
Plaça Manuel Malagrida, Olot, Catalonia, Spain
 Royal Crescent, Brighton, England
 Somerset Place, Bath, England
 Royal Crescent, Bath, England
 The Crescent, Wisbech, Isle of Ely, England
 Wellington Crescent, Ramsgate, England
 Tontine Crescent, Boston, Massachusetts, USA

References

 
House types
Types of streets